The Lima Rescue Mission is a city mission located in Lima, Ohio. Founded on November 1, 1906, by Adam Welty, the mission, which is funded completely by donations, provides daily necessities for homeless and needy individuals in and around Allen County, Ohio. It is the second oldest gospel rescue mission in Ohio, and the only facility of its kind in west central Ohio. The mission is a member of the Association of Gospel Rescue Missions, part of the global city mission movement.

History

On November 1, 1906, mission founder Rev. Adam Welty moved his family from Bluffton, Ohio to a new home at 207 East North Street in Lima, Ohio. This large rented house would serve as a residence for the family and also a haven for transient men needing food and lodging. It was not until later that Rev. Welty learned that their new home was in the heart of what was then the "red light district" of the city.
Within a few years, the house proved inadequate to care for the number of men coming for help. Although there were no funds in the Mission treasury for expansion Rev. Welty decided that a larger building was necessary. A site at the corner of Central and Wayne was selected and secured with a down payment of $200.00 which Mrs. Welty had managed to save. Construction finally began in March 1916, and was suspended for a time during World War I. In June 1920, the mission was finally able to move into its spacious new building, which is still in use today.

In the late 1940s the Rescue Mission began ministering to youth through child evangelism classes held in the mission's chapel. Over time the classes grew and it was realized that a larger, more dedicated space would be needed. In 1964 a large house, known as the "Children's Chapel" was purchased to meet this need. In 1974, land was purchased to build a new summer day camp, Camp Roberts. The camp, which occupies  in Shawnee Township, consists of a lodge, pool, chapel and recreation building.

Target Audience
Poor and homeless men
At risk youth

Basic Services
Emergency overnight shelter
Meals served daily
Clothing distribution
Transitional housing

Programs
Mighty Men life recovery & discipleship program
Daily chapel services, Bible studies
Group & individual Biblical counseling
Children's Chapel after school Bible classes and activities for inner city youth
Camp Roberts summer day camp for inner city youth

Statistics (2005)
14,545 meals served
3,561 lodgings provided in overnight shelter

External links
Lima Rescue Mission
Association of Gospel Rescue Missions

References

Rescue mission celebrates 100 years The Lima News, October 28, 2006

City and Gospel Rescue Missions
Lima, Ohio
Buildings and structures in Allen County, Ohio